Gdara Hamam (born 11 August 1980) is a Tunisian table tennis player. He competed in the men's singles event at the 2000 Summer Olympics.

References

1980 births
Living people
Tunisian male table tennis players
Olympic table tennis players of Tunisia
Table tennis players at the 2000 Summer Olympics
Place of birth missing (living people)
21st-century Tunisian people